Chenopodium desertorum, common name frosted goosefruit, is a species of flowering plant in the family Amaranthaceae, indigenous to Australia where it is found in all mainland states.

Taxonomy
It was first described by John McConnell Black as Chenopodium microphyllum var. desertorum, but in 1924 he redescribed it as Chenopodium desertorum.

Several subspecies are accepted:
Chenopodium desertorum subsp. desertorum
Chenopodium desertorum subsp. anidiophyllum (Aellen) Paul G.Wilson
Chenopodium desertorum subsp.  microphyllum Paul G.Wilson
Chenopodium desertorum subsp. rectum Paul G.Wilson
Chenopodium desertorum subsp. virosum Paul G.Wilson

References

External links
Google image search: Chenopodium desertorum 
FloraNT factsheet: Chenopodium desertorum
eFloraSA (Electronic Flora of South Australia): Chenopodium desertorum

desertorum
Flora of Australia
Taxa named by John McConnell Black
Plants described in 1922